Patrick Jake O'Rourke (November 14, 1947 – February 15, 2022) was an American libertarian political satirist and journalist. O'Rourke was the H. L. Mencken Research Fellow at the libertarian Cato Institute and a regular correspondent for The Atlantic Monthly, The American Spectator, and The Weekly Standard, and frequent panelist on National Public Radio's game show Wait Wait... Don't Tell Me! He was a columnist at The Daily Beast from 2011 to 2016.

He authored more than 20 books, the best known of which is Holidays in Hell, about his visits to war zones as a foreign correspondent. Three of his books made The New York Times Best Seller list. The Forbes Media Guide Five Hundred, 1994 states, "O'Rourke's original reporting, irreverent humour, and crackerjack writing makes for delectable reading. He never minces words or pulls his punches, whatever the subject."

Life and career
O'Rourke was born in Toledo, Ohio, the son of Delphine (née Loy), a housewife, and Clifford Bronson O'Rourke, a car salesman. O'Rourke had Irish ancestry that traces back to County Roscommon. He graduated from Toledo's DeVilbiss High School in 1965, received his undergraduate degree from Miami University in 1969 and earned a Master of Arts in English at Johns Hopkins University. Many of O'Rourke's essays recount that during his student days he was a leftist, anti-war hippie, but that in the 1970s his political views underwent a volte-face. He emerged as a political observer and humorist rooted in libertarian conservatism.

O'Rourke wrote articles for several publications, including "A.J. at N.Y.U." for The Rip Off Review of Western Culture, an underground magazine/comic book, in 1972, as well as pieces for the Baltimore underground newspaper Harry and the New York Ace, before joining National Lampoon in 1973, where he served as editor-in-chief, among other roles, and authored articles such as "Foreigners Around the World" and "How to Drive Fast on Drugs While Getting Your Wing-Wang Squeezed and Not Spill Your Drink".

O'Rourke received a writing credit for National Lampoon's Lemmings which helped launch the careers of Chevy Chase, and Christopher Guest. He also co-wrote National Lampoon's 1964 High School Yearbook with Douglas Kenney. This inspired the cult comedy, Animal House, which launched the career of John Belushi.

Going freelance in 1981, O'Rourke had his work published in Playboy, Vanity Fair, Car and Driver, and Rolling Stone. He became foreign-affairs desk chief at Rolling Stone, where he remained until 2001. In 1996, he served as the conservative commentator in the point-counterpoint segment of 60 Minutes. During the Bosnian genocide, O'Rourke referred to the American public's lack of interest in Bosnia as a way to joke about "the unspellables killing the unpronounceables". 

O'Rourke published over 20 books, including three New York Times bestsellers. Parliament of Whores and Give War a Chance reached No. 1 on The New York Times Best Seller list. He also wrote Modern Manners and Holidays in Hell. O'Rourke was a "Real Time Real Reporter" for Real Time with Bill Maher covering the 2008 presidential election. In the UK, he was known as the face of a long-running series of television advertisements for British Airways in the 1990s.

O'Rourke also worked on screenplays in Hollywood, including Rodney Dangerfield's Easy Money.

In 2009, O'Rourke described the nascent presidency of Barack Obama as "the Carter administration in better sweaters". However, in 2016, he endorsed presidential candidate Hillary Clinton over Donald Trump. O'Rourke stated that his endorsement included her "lies and empty promises" and added "She's wrong about absolutely everything, but she's wrong within normal parameters".

Personal life
From 1990 to 1993, O'Rourke was married to Amy Lumet, a daughter of movie director Sidney Lumet and a granddaughter of Lena Horne. In 1995, he married Tina Mallon; they had three children: daughters Elizabeth and Olivia and son Clifford. In an interview with the New Statesman published in January 2012, O'Rourke said, "Despite my name, I wasn't raised a Catholic. My mother was a Protestant, of a traditional American, vague kind: she belonged to the church that the nice people in the neighbourhood went to. My wife is a Catholic, the kids are Catholic, so I'm a Catholic fellow-traveller."

In September 2008, O'Rourke announced that he had been diagnosed with treatable rectal cancer, from which he expected "a 95% chance of survival". O'Rourke died from lung cancer at his home in Sharon, New Hampshire, on February 15, 2022, at the age of 74.

Writing
 
O'Rourke was a proponent of gonzo journalism; one of his earliest and best-regarded pieces was "How to Drive Fast on Drugs While Getting Your Wing-Wang Squeezed and Not Spill Your Drink", a National Lampoon article in March 1979. The article was republished in two of his books, Republican Party Reptile (1987) and Driving Like Crazy (2009).

O'Rourke's best-received book is Parliament of Whores, subtitled A Lone Humorist Attempts to Explain the Entire U.S. Government, whose main argument, according to the author, "is that politics are boring". He described himself as a libertarian.

O'Rourke typed his manuscripts on an IBM Selectric typewriter, though he denied being a Luddite, asserting that his short attention span would have made focusing on writing on a computer difficult.

Bibliography
 National Lampoon 1964 High School Yearbook Parody (1974; with Doug Kenney); 
 National Lampoon Sunday Newspaper Parody (1978; with John Hughes); 
 Modern Manners (1983); 
 The Bachelor Home Companion (1986); 
 Republican Party Reptile (1987); 
 Holidays in Hell (1989); 
 Parliament of Whores (1991); 
 Give War a Chance (1992); 
 All the Trouble in the World (1994); 
 Age and Guile Beat Youth, Innocence, and a Bad Haircut (1995); 
 The American Spectator's Enemies List (1996); 
 Eat the Rich (1999); 
 The CEO of the Sofa (2001); 
 Peace Kills: America's Fun New Imperialism (2004); 
 On the Wealth of Nations: Books That Changed the World (2007); 
 Driving Like Crazy (2009); 
 Don't Vote! – It Just Encourages the Bastards (2010) 
 Holidays in Heck (2011); 
 The Baby Boom: How It Got That Way (And It Wasn't My Fault) (And I'll Never Do It Again) (2014) 
 Thrown Under the Omnibus (2015); 
 How the Hell Did This Happen? The Election of 2016 (2017); 
 None of My Business: P.J. Explains Money, Banking, Debt, Equity, Assets, Liabilities, and Why He's Not Rich and Neither Are You (2018); 
 A Cry from the Far Middle: Dispatches from a Divided Land (2020);

See also
 War Feels Like War, in which P. J. O'Rourke stars

References

External links

 
 
 
 PJ O'Rourke delivers Australia's National Press Club Address
 Transcript (and video): ABC 7:30 Report: An Audience with PJ O'Rourke
  in 2004
 P.J. on The Hour
 
 In Depth interview with O'Rourke, January 7, 2007
 Articles at The Atlantic
 Articles at the Cato Institute
 BBC Radio 4 – Point of View program: Presidential Candidates (Sep 2015) 5audio 10min

1947 births
2022 deaths
American humorists
American parodists
American satirists
American political commentators
American political writers
American male journalists
Journalists from Ohio
20th-century American male writers
21st-century American male writers
Writers from New Hampshire
Writers from Toledo, Ohio
20th-century American non-fiction writers
21st-century American non-fiction writers
20th-century American comedians
21st-century American comedians
Comedians from New Hampshire
Comedians from Ohio
American libertarians
Cato Institute people
National Lampoon people
The American Spectator people
The Weekly Standard people
Rolling Stone people
60 Minutes correspondents
Johns Hopkins University alumni
Miami University alumni
American Methodists
People from Hillsborough County, New Hampshire
Deaths from cancer in New Hampshire
Deaths from lung cancer